MCF Mazdoor Sangh, a trade union at the Mangalore Chemicals and Fertilisers, in Karnataka, India. MCFMS is affiliated to Bharatiya Mazdoor Sangh.

Trade unions in India
Bharatiya Mazdoor Sangh-affiliated unions
Trade unions at the Mangalore Chemicals and Fertilisers
Chemical industry trade unions
Organizations with year of establishment missing